Jeff Kober (born December 18, 1953) is an American actor, known for his television roles as Dodger in China Beach, Jacob Hale Jr. in Sons of Anarchy, and Joe in the fourth season of The Walking Dead. He is also known his movie roles such as Roy Gaddis in Out of Bounds (1986), Patrick Channing in The First Power (1990), Marcus in One Tough Bastard (1995), and as Ponoma Joe in A Man Apart (2003). In February 2020, Kober joined the cast of ABC's General Hospital as Cyrus Renault. He exited the role in June 2021, but has made occasional guest appearances from August to December of the same year, winning a Daytime Emmy Award for Outstanding Supporting Actor in a Drama Series for his performance in the role in 2022.

Early life
Kober was born in Billings, Montana, on December 18, 1953. He moved to the Los Angeles area in his twenties and studied acting with theater educator Ed Kaye-Martin.

Career
Kober may be best known as Dodger in China Beach and Daedalus in the short-lived cult horror series Kindred: The Embraced. He has made guest appearances on such television series as Buffy the Vampire Slayer, Law & Order: Special Victims Unit, CSI: Crime Scene Investigation, ER, 24, The Closer, New Girl, Criminal Minds, Star Trek: Voyager, and Star Trek: Enterprise. He played the character Julian Bradley in the two-part 1985 episode entitled "The Monster: Part 1&2" on Highway to Heaven. He played Jacob Hale, Jr. in the FX series Sons of Anarchy and Joe in the AMC series The Walking Dead. He also featured as DJ Ray from Reef Radio in Bacardi 1990s 'serve chilled' advertising campaign. In 2013, Kober reprised his role as Daedalus for the Kindred: The Embraced DVD set in a special features segment called "Daedalus: The Last Will and Testament," which is meant for Abel (the boy Daedalus wanted to embrace in the episode "Romeo and Juliet"), who is now an adult and was embraced by Julian Luna as Kindred. He played a role in the 2005 film Love's Long Journey. He appeared in an episode of It's Always Sunny in Philadelphia called "Gun Fever Too: Still Hot".

On June 24, 2022, Kober won the Daytime Emmy Award for Outstanding Supporting Actor in a Drama Series for his role as Cyrus Renault on General Hospital.

Personal life
Kober is twice divorced. He married Rhonda Talbot on February 4, 1989; they had one child. On August 25, 1998, Kober married his second wife, fashion publicist Kelly Cutrone. Their marriage ended in divorce. On December 31, 2013, Kober married his current wife, Adele Slaughter.

Kober is a bass guitarist who is a former member of The Walking Wounded.

Kober visited Vietnam with co-star Dana Delany during filming of the television drama series China Beach (1988), which was based on U.S. involvement in the Vietnam War. Their visit is documented in the Dana Delany episode of the series Intimate Portrait (1993), which features a discussion and photographs of their journey.

Kober is a noted artist who is responsible for the paintings attributed to his character Daedalus on Kindred: The Embraced (1996). Kober and Adele Slaughter (third wife) co-authored Art That Pays: The Emerging Artist's Guide to Making a Living.

Filmography

Film

Television

References

External links
 
 tv.com biography

1953 births
American male film actors
American male television actors
20th-century American male actors
21st-century American male actors
Daytime Emmy Award winners
Daytime Emmy Award for Outstanding Supporting Actor in a Drama Series winners
Living people
Male actors from Montana
People from Billings, Montana